Ireland participated in the Junior Eurovision Song Contest 2021, held in Paris, France. Maiú Levi Lawlor was selected by TG4 through a televised national final, with his song, " (Disappear)", being internally selected.

The country returned to the contest after a break of one year from the 2020 contest due to the COVID-19 pandemic.

Background

In , Anna Kearney represented the country with the song "Banshee", finishing 12th out of 19 entries with 73 points. Despite having initially confirmed their participation in the  contest in Warsaw, Poland in January 2020, TG4 announced in August 2020 that they would not participate in the contest due to the COVID-19 pandemic.

Before Junior Eurovision

Junior Eurovision Éire
Junior Eurovision Éire returned to select the Irish act. Eoghan McDermott, who hosted the selection from 2015 to 2019, did not return to host the selection. He was replaced by Louise Cantillon, a Dublin based radio presenter.

All songs were performed in Irish.

Jury members 
As in previous editions, the results of each show were decided by an in-studio jury of two permanent members and revolving guest judges. The two permanent judges were:

 Niamh Ní Chróinín – Radio presenter, manager of Irish-language youth radio station Raidió Rí-Rá
 Fiachna Ó Braonáin – Member of Hothouse Flowers (interval act at Eurovision Song Contest 1988), a permanent judge on Junior Eurovision Éire 2016-2018, composer of "Banshee" (Junior Eurovision 2019 Irish entry)

Heat 1

Lilyella Buckley received the highest number of stars, and advanced directly to the semi-final. Eva Norton and Orla McDermott both advanced to the final duel stage and performed their covers a second time. After their second performances, the jury members selected Eva as the winner, granting a spot in the semi-final.

Heat 2

Shannon Copeland received the highest number of stars, and advanced directly to the semi-final. Cora Harkin and Sienna Hopkins both advanced to the final duel stage and performed their covers a second time. After their second performances, the jury members selected Cora as the winner, granting a spot in the semi-final.

Heat 3

Sophie Lennon received the highest number of stars, and advanced directly to the semi-final. Sadbh Breathnach and Alison McGrath both advanced to the final duel stage and performed their covers a second time. After their second performances, the jury members selected Alison as the winner, granting a spot in the semi-final.

Heat 4

Julie Cole received the highest number of stars, and advanced directly to the semi-final. Maiú Levi Lawlor and Ruby Maher both advanced to the final duel stage and performed their covers a second time. After their second performances, the jury members selected Maiú as the winner, granting a spot in the semi-final.

Semi-final

Lilyella Buckley and Sophie Lennon were both chosen by the jury to advance directly to the final. Maiú Levi Lawlor and Julie Cole were both chosen to go through to the final duel stage and performed their covers a second time. After their second performances, the jury members selected Maiú as the winner, granting a spot in the final.

Final
The final of Junior Eurovision Éire was broadcast on 17 October 2021, with Linda Martin as the guest judge. Each artist performed two songs before the jury decided on two of them to advance to the final duel. In the final duel, Maiú Levi Lawlor was selected as the winner of Junior Eurovision Éire 2021.

Song release 
Lawlor's song, " (Disappear)" was released on 16 November 2021, along with a music video.

At Junior Eurovision
After the opening ceremony, which took place on 13 December 2021, it was announced that Ireland would perform eighth on 19 December 2021, following Russia and preceding Armenia.

At the end of the contest, Ireland received 44 points, placing 18th out of 19 participating countries.

Voting

Detailed voting results

References

Ireland
2021
Junior Eurovision Song Contest
Junior Eurovision Song Contest